California's 45th congressional district is a congressional district in the U.S. state of California currently represented by Republican Michelle Steel. It was one of 18 districts that voted for Joe Biden in the 2020 presidential election while being won or held by a Republican in 2022.

The 45th district was created as a result of the redistricting cycle after the 1980 Census.

The district is based in Orange and Los Angeles counties and includes all of Garden Grove, Westminster, Cerritos, Buena Park, Placentia, Hawaiian Gardens, Cypress, Fountain Valley, Artesia, Los Alamitos, Rossmoor, and La Palma, as well as parts of Brea and Fullerton.

Competitiveness

2018 midterm elections

Incumbent Walters competed against a field of four Democrats and an independent candidate in the primary election for the 2018 midterm elections. On February 25, 2018, UC Irvine (UCI) assistant law professor Dave Min received the endorsement of the California Democratic Party.

Min, former White House senior technology advisor Brian Forde, former legislative assistant to Sherrod Brown (D-OH) Kia Hamadanchy, UCI law professor Katie Porter, and UCI business professor John Graham ran in the "top two" primary in June 2018. Walters and Porter placed first and second and advanced to the general election in November.

On November 14, 2018, 8 days after polls closed, Dave Wasserman, then the House Editor for The Cook Political Report, projected that Porter had won the general election.

In statewide races

Composition

As of the 2020 redistricting, California's 45th congressional district is located in Southern California. It takes up western Orange County and east Los Angeles.

Orange County is split between this district, the 40th district, the 46th district, and the 47th district. The 45th and 40th are partitioned by Orange Freeway, E Lambert Rd, Sunrise Rd, Foothill Ln, Wandering Ln, N Associated Rd, E Birch St, S Valencia Ave, La Plaza Dr, La Floresta Dr, La Crescenta Dr, Highway 90, 1053 E Imperial Highway-343 Tolbert St, Vesuvius Dr, Rose Dr, Wabash Ave, 6th St, Golden Ave, Carbon Canyon Creek, E Yorba Linda Blvd, Jefferson St, 1401 Zion Ave-N Van Buren St, Buena Vista Ave, 17225 Orange Blossom Ln-1480 E Howard Pl, 17511 Pine Cir-Orchard Dr, Mariposa Ave, Lakeview Ave, E Miraloma Ave, Fee-Ana St, Sierra Madre Cir, E Orangethorpe Ave, Burlington Northern Santa Fe Railroad, Kensington Ave, N Kraemer Blvd, Carbon Creek, and E La Jolla St.

The 45th and 46th are partitioned by Santa Ana River, W Lehnhardt Ave, Gloxinia Ave, Lilac Way, Edinger Ave, Pebble Ct, 10744 W Lehnhardt Ave-10726 Kedge Ave, 724 S Sail St-5641 W Barbette Ave-407 S Starboard St, Starboard St/S Cooper St, Taft St, Hazard Ave, N Euclid St, Westminster Ave, Clinton St, 14300 Clinton St-1001 Mar Les Dr, Mar Les Dr, 2729 Huckleberry Rd, N Fairview St, Fairview St, 13462 Garden Grove Blvd-13252 Marty Ln, Townley St/Siemon Ave, W Garden Grove Blvd, S Lewis St, W Chapman Ave, E Simmons Ave, S Haster St, Ascot Dr, W Orangewood Ave, S 9th St, 2209 S Waverly Dr-11751 S Waverly Dr, Euclid St, Haven Ln, W Dudley Ave, S Euclid St, Katella Ave, Dale St, Rancho Alamitos High School, Orangewood Ave, Barber City Channel, Arrowhead St, Del Rey Dr, Westcliff Dr, Lampson Ave, Fern St, Garden Glove Blvd, Union Pacific Railroad, 7772 W Chapman Ave-Bently Ave, Highway 39, Western Ave, Stanton Storm Channel, Knott Ave, 6970 Via Kannela-6555 Katella Ave, Cerritos Ave, 10490 Carlotta Ave-Ball Rd, John Beat Park, S Knott Ave, Solano Dr, Monterra Way, Campesina Dr, Holder Elementary School, W Orange Ave, 6698 Via Riverside Way-Orangeview Junior High School, W Lincoln Ave, 195 N Western Ave-298 N Western Ave, 3181 W Coolidge Ave-405 N Dale St, W Crescent Ave, N La Reina St,  W La Palma Ave, Boisseranc Park, I-5 HOV Lane, Orangethorpe Ave, Fullerton Creek, Whitaker St, Commonwealth Ave, Los Angeles County Metro, W Malvern Ave, W Chapman Ave, E Chapman Ave, S Placentia Ave, Kimberly Ave, E Orangethorpe Ave, and 2500 E Terrace St-Highway 57.

The 45th and 47th are partitioned by Highway 405, Old Ranch Parkway, Seal Beach Blvd, St Cloud Dr, Montecito Rd, Rossmoor Center Way, 12240 Seal Beach Blvd-Los Alamitos Army Airfield, Bolsa Chica Channel, Rancho Rd, Harold Pl, Springdale St, 6021 Anacapa Dr-Willow Ln, Edward St, Bolsa Ave, Goldenwest St, McFadden Ave, Union Pacific Railroad, 15241 Cascade Ln-15241 Cedarwood Ave, Highway 39, Edinger Ave, Newland St, Heil Ave, Magnolia St, Warner Ave, Garfield Ave, and the Santa Ana River.

The 45th district takes in the cities of Cypress, Brea, Placentia, Westminster, Garden Grove, Buena Park, Fountain Valley, and northern Fullerton, as well as the census-designated place Rossmoor.

Los Angeles County is split between this district, the 38th district, and the 42nd district. The 45th and 42nd are partitioned by San Gabriel River, Palo Verde Ave, South St, Del Amo Blvd, Pioneer Blvd, Coyote Creek, Centralia Creek, Hawaiian Ave, Verne Ave, Bloomfield Park, Highway 605, 226th St, Dorado Cir, Cortner Ave, E Woodson St, Bloomfield Ave, Lilly Ave, Marna Ave, and Los Alamos Channel.

The 45th and 38th are partitioned by Valley View Ave, Southern Pacific Railroad, Alondra Blvd, 15917 Canyon Creek Rd-12371 Hermosura St, Norwalk Blvd, 166th St, and Cerritos College Child Development-Alondra Blvd. The 45th district takes in the cities of Cerritos, Artesia, and Hawaiian Gardens.

Cities & CDP with 10,000 or more people
 Garden Grove - 171,949
 Fullerton - 143,617
 Westminster - 90,643
 Buena Park - 84,034
 Fountain Valley - 57,047
 Placentia - 51,233
 Cypress - 50,151
 Brea - 47,325
 Cerritos - 49,578
 Artesia - 16,395
 Hawaiian Gardens - 14,149
 Rossmoor - 10,625

List of members representing the district

Election results

1982

1984

1986

1988

1990

1992

1994

1996

1998

2000

2002

2004

2006

2008

2010

2012

2014

2016

2018

2020

2022

Historical district boundaries
From 2003 to 2013, this district was based in Riverside County. The district included the communities of Palm Springs, Moreno Valley, Palm Desert, Hemet, Cathedral City, Temecula, Blythe, Rancho Mirage, Murrieta, Indio, Indian Wells, La Quinta, Cabazon, Anza, Thermal, Idyllwild, Coachella, and other unincorporated areas of Riverside County.

See also
List of United States congressional districts

References

External links
GovTrack.us: California's 45th congressional district
RAND California Election Returns: District Definitions
California Voter Foundation map - CD45

45
Government in Orange County, California
Anaheim, California
Irvine, California
Laguna Hills, California
Lake Forest, California
Mission Viejo, California
Orange, California
Tustin, California
Constituencies established in 1983
1983 establishments in California